Richard le Molyneux (fl. 1312) was an English politician.

Le Molyneux represented the constituency of Lancashire in 1312.

References

13th-century births
14th-century deaths
English MPs 1312
Members of the Parliament of England (pre-1707) for Lancashire